Vítor José Domingos Campos (Torres Vedras, Lisbon District, 11 March 1944 - Coimbra, 8 March 2019) was a Portuguese footballer who played as a midfielder.

See also
List of one-club men

External links

1944 births
People from Torres Vedras
Portuguese footballers
Association football midfielders
Primeira Liga players
Liga Portugal 2 players
Associação Académica de Coimbra – O.A.F. players
Portugal international footballers
2019 deaths
Sportspeople from Lisbon District